The Conception Group is a geologic group in Newfoundland and Labrador. It preserves fossils dating back to the Ediacaran period.  It mainly contains turbidites, but is interrupted by a glacial diamictite, and tops out with sand and siltstones (these dated to 565 Ma).
It corresponds to the lower portion of the Connecting Point Group

In some areas the Drook Formation continues from the base of the group to the base of the Mistaken Point Formation; elsewhere (in central / south Avalon) the Briscal, Gaskiers and Mall Bay Formations wedge in.

See also

 List of fossiliferous stratigraphic units in Newfoundland and Labrador

References
 

Ediacaran Newfoundland and Labrador